Speaking for Myself: Faith, Freedom, and the Fight of Our Lives Inside the Trump White House is a 2020 book by Sarah Sanders.

References

2020 non-fiction books
American memoirs
Books about the Trump administration
St. Martin's Press books